Lumina (Romanian for "the light") is a commune in Constanța County, Northern Dobruja, Romania.

The commune includes three villages:
 Lumina (historical names: Valea Neagră (until 1965); Cogealia, Kogea-Ali (until 1929) -)
 Oituz - established in 1926, named after Oituz (Bacău County)
 Sibioara (historical name: Cicrâcci)

Demographics
At the 2011 census, Lumina had 7,619 Romanians (93.82%), 104 Roma  (1.28%), 95 Turks (1.17%), 282 Tatars (3.47%), 4 Aromanians (0.05%), 17 others (0.21%).

A large community of Csángó Hungarians lives in the village of Oituz.

References

Communes in Constanța County
Localities in Northern Dobruja